Semum is a 2008 Turkish horror film produced, written and directed by Hasan Karacadağ which reportedly recounts the true story of a woman who lives in İzmir, Turkey.

Plot 
Twenty-seven-year-old Canan (Ayça İnci) and her husband Volkan (Burak Hakkı) have just moved into a large, new house. Life seems to continue on its routine track in the young couple's new house until one day, when Canan starts feeling that strange things are happening to her although she cannot understand what or why. Canan gradually starts turning into an evil creature as a mysterious and malicious being takes control of her body and actions day after day. Semum, the most loyal servant of the devil, has taken control of Canan, leading her towards hell.

Cast

Production
Talking about the film in Today's Zaman the director argues that, "he tried to create a model of a Turco-Islamic horror film and that he would make the world recognize this model, of which he sees Semum as the first example. Semum will be compared with The Exorcist and star Ayça İnci will be compared with Linda Blair, the director told Today's Zaman, noting that the Turkish horror films made so far have been far from satisfactory.

Filming
The film was shot on location in Istanbul, Turkey.

 Release 

Reception

Box office
The film was the thirteenth highest grossing Turkish film of 2008 with a total gross of $1,827,047.

 Reviews 
Todd Brown, writing for Twitch Film, notes that this film, like the director's previous hit Dabbe, "once again draws on Islamic mythology and demons as its inspiration," but that, "he had a better budget to work with this time and the cinematography is a good bit better while also indulging Turkey's traditional campy edge". "Cinematography and design work is dead solid and I do believe I detect notes of both Death Note and Constantine'' in the demon and hell effects," he adds.

See also 
 List of Islamic films
 2008 in film
 Samūm
 Turkish films of 2008

References

External links
  for the film
 
 

2008 films
2008 horror films
Films set in Turkey
Turkish horror films
Demons in film
Films about Islam
2000s Turkish-language films